Laura Samojłowicz (born 14 February 1985 in Hamburg, West Germany) is a Polish actress and singer. She was born in Germany. Her family and her returned to Poland when she was 4 years old. She won season 5 of the Polish version of Soapstar Superstar. 

She auditioned for 6th season of The Voice of Poland'' but failed to progress to the next round as none of the four coaches spun their chairs around.

Filmography

References

Polish actresses
1985 births
Living people
Polish expatriates in Germany